Víctor Manuel Vucetich Rojas (born 25 June 1955) is a Mexican professional football manager and former player, who is the current manager of Liga MX club Monterrey.

With a career spanning more than thirty years, Vucetich is one of the most decorated managers in the history of Mexican football. He has coached thirteen teams in the Liga MX, winning five league championships with four clubs. He has also won four Copa México championships, an InterLiga championship and two second division titles, as well as three CONCACAF Champions League cups.

Because of his many achievements with multiple clubs he is popularly nicknamed by the Mexican press, players and fans as El Rey Midas (King Midas) because "everything he touches turns to gold"

Managerial career

Mexico
In October 2010, Víctor Manuel Vucetich was identified as the most advanced of the candidates to fill the vacant post of the Selección de fútbol de México (Mexico national team), even receiving an official contact after several weeks of "scratching in the realm of speculation", as he called it. He ultimately ruled out the possibility of taking over the national team, citing commitments with then-employer Monterrey as well as personal reasons. On October 16, Vucetich explained at a press conference his role as a father, thus declining the opportunity to coach the national team, stating: "Yesterday evening is ultimately where I determined to step aside to avoid a larger problem for the federation, so that someone can give their full time to the national team. The reasons for which I have made this decision are personal and family related more than anything."

On September 12, 2013, a few days after leaving Monterrey, Vucetich was officially named coach of the Mexico national team. He won his first match in charge, a vital 2–1 win over visiting Panama national team, which was Mexico's first victory at the Azteca in the final round of qualifications.

On October 17, two days after Mexico lost their match against Costa Rica, Vucetich was sacked, being replaced by Miguel Herrera. This occurred after the polemics that arose after the team's abysmal performance in their World Cup qualifying campaign, managing to reach the play-off against New Zealand due to the United States's 3–2 victory over Panama.

Querétaro
On 23 February 2015 Vucetich was officially appointed as Querétaro F.C. head coach. In his first season, he led Querétaro to their inaugural final facing Santos Laguna. Querétaro lost in the first leg, rebounded in the second leg (5–0) then fell short by two goals. His tenure with the club ended in 2017.

Guadalajara
On 13 August, he was named as Guadalajara's new manager. Two days later, he would win his debut match with the team against Atlético San Luis in a 2–1 home victory.

Honours

Manager
Potros Neza
Segunda División: 1988–89

León

Primera División: 1991–92
Segunda División: 1989–90

Tecos
Primera División: 1993–94

Tigres UANL
Copa México: 1995–96

Cruz Azul
Copa México: 1996–97

Pachuca
Primera División: Apertura 2003

Monterrey
Primera División: Apertura 2009, Apertura 2010
InterLiga: 2010
CONCACAF Champions League: 2010–11, 2011–12, 2012–13
FIFA Club World Cup: Third place 2012

Querétaro
Copa MX: Apertura 2016

Individual
Primera División de México Manager of the tournament: 1991–92, 1993–94, 2009 Apertura, 2010 Apertura

References

External links 
 
Víctor Manuel Vucetich at official Liga MX Profile

1955 births
Living people
Liga MX players
Mexican football managers
Mexican people of Croatian descent
Mexican people of Serbian descent
C.F. Oaxtepec footballers
C.F. Monterrey managers
Club Puebla managers
Club León managers
Cruz Azul managers
C.D. Veracruz managers
Tecos F.C. managers
Chiapas F.C. managers
Mexico national football team managers
Querétaro F.C. managers
Footballers from Tamaulipas
Mexican footballers
Sportspeople from Tampico, Tamaulipas
Association football midfielders